Mineral del Monte, commonly called Real del Monte or El Real, is a small mining town, and one of the 84 municipalities of Hidalgo, in the State of Hidalgo in east-central Mexico.

As of 2005, the municipality had a total population of 11,944 — with Mauricio Rodriguez Téllez as head of the municipal council.

History 
The Mine District of Pachuca—Real del Monte has a long and rich heritage. The mines in the district are conservatively estimated to have produced 1.2 billion Troy ounces of silver and 6.2 million ounces of gold. That is 6% of the silver mined throughout the world during the last five centuries. Some of the mines have continued limited production until the present day.

Gold and silver were discovered after the Spanish conquest of Mexico in the 1520s. The Colonial Spanish began mining in the 16th century in the Pachuca area, but the mines were suffering from flooding by 1725.   In 1741, Pedro Romero de Terreros and Jose Alejandro Bustamante started a drainage program using an adit.

The native Mexican Amerindians were often enslaved to work the mines, despite the Royal mandate for Colonial Jesuit Reductions and later Franciscan Indian Reductions. In addition, Africans were imported to replace Indian slaves.  The Real del Monte 1766 Strike is considered by many to be the first real labor strike in North American history.

The town's steep streets, stairways and small squares are lined with low buildings, some dating back to the Spanish colonial Viceroyalty of New Spain period (1500s - 1810). The older houses with high sloping roofs and chimneys in town show the 19th century Cornish and English influence.

19th-century Cornish miners

Mining
The  Cornish role in the development of Mexican silver mining is significant. The Cornish brought "new" mining technology of the industrial revolution in the 1820s, reviving Mexican silver mining. Especially important was British equipment to drain mine tunnels flooded by groundwater since the Spanish period. The majority of immigrant miners came from the Cornish Central Mining District of Camborne-Redruth-Gwennap in Cornwall. The Cornish firm that ran the Real del Monte-Pachuca mines between 1824 and 1848, employed 350 Cornish miners and, when the mines were in full operation, the municipality was once the richest in the state.

One of the leading personalities in 19th-century Mexico mining was Francis Rule, from Camborne in Cornwall. Known as El Rey de la Plata (Silver King), Rule left a mark on the Pachucan cityscape, with civic generosity to his adopted homeland.  His opinion could be a barometer for the rise and fall of mining shares. He became very wealthy from his numerous mining interests in the district. One was the Santa Gertrudis Mine, which by 1898 was one of the most productive in the State of Hidalgo under Cornish management. 

Four extant Cornish mine engine houses, and the 'English' Cemetery (Panteon Inglés) containing the graves of hundreds of Cornishmen in Pachuca, bear witness to the Cornish contributions to Mexican silver mining for over a century. The cemetery is undergoing restoration following storm damage in 2016.

Sports
It was the Cornish who first introduced soccer/football to Mexico (Pachuca). The first game of what would go on to be Mexico's national past time (futbol), was first played in Mexico by Cornish miners at Pachuca in 1900, a fact that is celebrated each year. The first soccer club in the country, the Pachuca Athletic Club, was also founded in that year. The first team consisted of Charles Dawe, John Dawe, James Bennetts, John Bennetts, William Blamey, Richard Sobey, William Bragg, William Thomas, Percy Bunt, Lionel Bunt, Albert Pengelly and William Pengelly, a decidedly 'Cornish' team. The Pachuca club encouraged the formation of teams in Mexico City and Orizaba, the first championship was played in 1902 and 'El Pachuca' won the 1904-05 tournament.  Also rugby union, cricket, tennis, polo, chess among other sports, were introduced here.

Methodism was introduced to Roman Catholic Mexico by the Cornish upon their arrival, and most of the descendants of the Cornish in Real del Monte and Pachuca are of Methodist faith. They brought Methodist Christianity to other major Mexican cities as they relocated. Mexican remittances helped to build the Wesleyan Chapel in Redruth, Cornwall, in the 1820s.

Geology
The Pachuca-Mineral del Monte silver mining district is at the southern end of a metalliferous mineral zone that extends northwest to encompass Mineral del Chico to the Zimapan lead-mining district to the northwest.  The ore deposits occur in the volcanic Tertiary Pachuca Group, principally andesite-rhyolite flow series with intervening tuff beds.  The deposits are epithermal sulfide minerals within steeply dipping normal fault veins.  Acanthite and argentite are the principal silver ore minerals.  Between 1973 through 1981, Compania De Real Del Monte Y Pachuca, S.A., produced 24,762,667.2 Troy ounces of silver and 133,950.33 Troy ounces of gold.

The richest vein of silver was the Veta Vizcaina, or the Vizcaina Vein, which extended 5 km to the east of Real del Monte.  Productive mines along this vein included the San Francisco, Santa Agueda (1767), Santa Teresa (1734), La Joya (1734), San Cayetano (1751), Dolores (1734), and La Palma (1734).  By 1750, Pedro Terreros had control of this lucrative vein.  Production continued until the mid-1770s.

Tourism

Real del Monte was named a "Pueblo Mágico" by the federal government, for its unique historical qualities, aesthetics, and traditions.  There are significant examples of Spanish Colonial architecture, in individual buildings and via the overall cityscape, that are preserved in the town.

Little Cornwall
The twin silver mining settlements of Pachuca and Real del Monte (Mineral del Monte) in the State of Hidalgo have been marketed as 'Mexico's Little Cornwall' by the Mexican Embassy in London since 2007. This represents the first attempt by the Spanish-speaking part of the Cornish diaspora to establish formal links with Cornwall. The Camborne Town Council voted on 19 July 2007 to twin with Pachuca and on 16 August 2007 a public meeting confirmed the earlier decision of Redruth Town Council to twin with Real del Monte. The formal twinning ceremony took place at Mineral del Monte in July 2008 during the visit of the Cornish Mexican Cultural Society.

 
Paste
Real del Monte is a home of the paste in Mexico, with 30 paste producers in the town. A little larger than cocktail pasties common to the UK, the Mexican-made versions are widely varied including: meat and potato, black bean, shredded chicken, and sausage, all heavily laced with chillies plus a range of sweet pasties including: pineapple, apple, strawberry, and blackberry. A number have developed into national chains with shops in towns and cities across Mexico. The town of Real del Monte is the site of a museum of Cornish pasties, opened in 2011.

International Pasty Festival
In October 2009 the town of Real del Monte (twinned with Redruth, Cornwall) held the first International Pasty Festival (Festival Internacional del Paste). Organised by the Municipality of Real del Monte, the paste producers and the Cornish Mexican Cultural Society Chapter Mexico, the Festival was a great success drawing an estimated 8,000 visitors to the town for the three-day event.  A coach of visitors travelled from Cuernavaca, some four hours away, and another from Mexico City.  The Festival was opened by the President Municipal of Real del Monte, Ing. Omar Mariano Skewes. During the opening speeches it was stated that ‘ Cornish people rebuilt our shattered mining industry giving us work and now again, when we have lost that industry, the Cornish have given us pastes and a new source of income’.
  
As is usual on festival days in this town, the programme commenced with a visit to the Cornish Cemetery and a guided tour by Bridget Galsworthy of the British Society, followed by wreath-laying at the Miner´s Monument. The main street was transformed with a long line of tented stands where ‘pastes’ of all descriptions were produced and a large stage next to the Miners' Memorial provided dance and other entertainments throughout the Festival.

Notable citizens 
At the end of the 19th century, the engineer Andrés Aldasoro worked in the Las dos Estrellas mine. Two of his sons, Juan Pablo Aldasoro and Eduardo Aldasoro Suárez, were born in Mineral del Monte. As adults, they became pioneers in aviation, and both became members of the Early Birds of Aviation. Alfred C. Crowle was the Cornish born miner who emigrated to Mexico and in 1935 became manager to the national Mexican football team.

John Edgar Benjamin Vial was a Cornish-Mexican who fought in the British Imperial Forces during World War I. He died in the Battle of Somme. For his service he received the British War Medal and the Victory Medal. There is a monument in his honor at the Panteon Inglés.

See also
Huasca de Ocampo
British Mexican
Programa Pueblos Mágicos ("Magical Villages Program")
Viceroyalty of New Spain — Spanish Colonial Mexico.

Gallery

References

External links 

 —official Real del Monte website
 —Pueblos Magicos de Mexico: Real del Monte
 Cornish-Mexico.org
 Projects.ex.ac.uk: The Cornish in Latin America

Municipalities of Hidalgo (state)
Populated places in Hidalgo (state)
Mining communities in Mexico
Pueblos Mágicos
Cornish diaspora